The following is a list of episodes of the Colombian television series El man es Germán, broadcast on RCN Televisión from 20 December 2019 until 6 February 2012. On 1 October 2018 it was confirmed that the series would be revived for a fourth season, which premiered on 20 May 2019.

Series overview

Episodes

Season 1 (2010–11)

Season 2 (2011)

Season 3 (2011–12)

Season 4 (2019)

Notes

References 

El man es Germán